The discography American rapper Fivio Foreign consists of one studio album, two extended plays, and 29 singles (including 13 as a featured artist).

Studio albums

Extended plays

Singles

As lead artist

As featured artist

Other charted songs

Guest appearances

Notes

References

Hip hop discographies